Trạm Tấu is a rural district of Yên Bái province, in the Northeast region of Vietnam. As of 2003, the district had a population of 21,887. The district covers an area of 742 km². The district capital lies at Trạm Tấu.

References

Districts of Yên Bái province
Yên Bái province